Sir Philip Musgrave, 2nd Baronet (21 May 1607 – 7 February 1678) was an English politician who sat in the House of Commons of England from 1640 to 1643 and from 1661 to 1678. He served in the  Royalist army in the Civil War.

Biography
Musgrave was the son of  Sir Richard Musgrave, who was MP for Westmorland, and his wife Frances Wharton, daughter of Philip Lord Wharton. The Musgrave family had been settled at Musgrave in Westmorland for many centuries. He inherited the baronetcy on the death of his father in 1615.

In April 1640, Musgrave was elected Member of Parliament for Westmorland in the Short Parliament. He was re-elected for Westmorland in November 1640 for the Long Parliament. He supported the King and was disabled from sitting in parliament in March 1643. Musgrave was Governor of Carlisle and fought for the King at the Battle of Marston Moor and the Battle of Worcester.

He was appointed the Governor of the Isle of Man by the Charlotte Stanley, Countess of Derby during the Manx Rebellion of 1651.

After the Restoration, Musgrave was appointed Custos Rotulorum of Westmorland from 1660 until his death and was re-elected MP for Westmorland in 1661 for the Cavalier Parliament and sat until his death in 1678.  He was offered a peerage as Baron Musgrave, of Hartley Castle in the County of Westmorland, but did not take up the patent.
 
Musgrave died at Eden Hall at the age of 70.

Musgrave married Julia Hutton, daughter of Sir Richard Hutton of Goldsborough Hall, Yorkshire. He was succeeded in the baronetcy by his son Richard.

References

Further reading

1607 births
1678 deaths
Baronets in the Baronetage of England
People from Westmorland
Cavaliers
English MPs 1640 (April)
English MPs 1640–1648
English MPs 1661–1679
Governors of the Isle of Man
Philip